The Battle of Jangsari is a 2019 South Korean action-war film co-directed by Kwak Kyung-taek and Kim Tae-hoon, starring Kim Myung-min, Megan Fox, and Choi Min-ho in the lead roles. The second installment in a trilogy following Operation Chromite, the film tells the true story of a group of 772 student soldiers who staged a small diversionary operation at Jangsari beach in Yeongdeok to draw away North Korean attention from Incheon.

Megan Fox plays the role of Maggie, an American reporter and war correspondent for the New York Herald Tribune, who covered the Korean War and called on the international community for assistance. Kim Myung-min plays a guerrilla task force commander while Choi Min-ho plays a low-ranking soldier. George Eads plays the leader of the landing operation.

Produced by Taewon Entertainment and distributed by Warner Bros. Korea, the film released theatrically in South Korea on 25 September 2019 and was released in U.S. on 4 October 2019 by Well Go USA.

Synopsis

During the Korean War, a group of 772 student soldiers led by a guerrilla task force commander is tasked with staging a diversionary mission at Jangsari Beach in South Korea, in order to deceive the North Korean forces into thinking the opposition forces would launch a decisive invasion there. In doing so, they would be able to pave the way for the Incheon Landing Operation. Meanwhile, an American reporter and war correspondent (Megan Fox) covers the Korean War and tries to get help from the international community as the soldiers struggle to accomplish their mission due to a lack of proper training, weapons, and adequate food and supplies.

Cast
 Kim Myung-min as Lee Myung-joon
 Megan Fox as Maggie (fictional character based on Marguerite Higgins and Margaret Bourke-White)
 Choi Min-ho as Choi Sung-pil
 Kim Sung-cheol as Ki Ha-ryun
 Kim In-kwon as Ryu Tae-seok
 Kwak Si-yang as Park Chan-nyeon
 Jang Ji-gun as Guk Man-deuk
 Lee Ho-jung as Moon Jong-nyeo
 Lee Jae-wook as Lee Gae-tae
 Go Geon-han as Choi Jae-pil
 Dong Bang-woo as General Lim Choon-bong
 George Eads as Colonel Stephen
 Jeong Jong-jun as Guk Man-deuk (old)
 Kim Min-kyu as Choi Jae-pil
 Choi Jae-pil as North Korean Army General
 Han Chul-woo as Moonsan ship captain
 Jang Myung-kab as Jochiwon ship captain
 Baek Shin as Myung troops officer 1
 Oh Gyu-chul as village North Korean Army soldier 2
 Daniel Joey Albright as U.S. Navy soldier 2

Filming
Principal photography commenced on 3 October 2018 and was completed on 12 January 2019.

Release
The film was released in 1,090 South Korean theaters on 25 September 2019. It was released in the USA theatrically on 4 October 2019 with English subtitles.

Reception
Yoon Min-sik from The Korea Herald praised the opening sequence, the subsequent 40 minutes and how the film managed to introduce the main characters and their traits without feeling forced while also depicting the gritty, grotesque face of war. However, the reviewer felt the plot was "too contrived", Fox's character spelt out the director's message through her dialogue, and that the film started out as something like Saving Private Ryan and ended up along the lines of Pearl Harbor.

Box office
Opening alongside By Quantum Physics: A Nightlife Venture, the film debuted at the number one position and sold over 485,000 tickets (USD $3.44 million) through the weekend and a total of 690,000 tickets (USD $4.57 million) in its first five days.

Awards and nominations

References

External links
 
 
 
 

South Korean action war films
Action films based on actual events
2010s action war films
Films set in 1950
Films shot in South Korea
2010s English-language films
English-language South Korean films
Korean War films
2010s Korean-language films
South Korean historical action films
War films based on actual events
2019 films
2010s historical action films
2010s South Korean films
Warner Bros. films